European Parliament elections were held in Denmark on 14 June 1984 to elect the 15 Danish members of the European Parliament. Elections were held separately in Greenland to elect one Greenlandic member.

Results

References

Denmark
European Parliament elections in Denmark
Europe